A fathom is a unit of length in the imperial and the U.S. customary systems equal to , used especially for measuring the depth of water. The fathom is neither an International Standard (SI) unit, nor an internationally-accepted non-SI unit. Historically, however, it is the most frequently employed maritime measure of depth in the English-speaking world.

There are two yards (6 feet) in an imperial fathom. Originally the span of a man's outstretched arms, the size of a fathom has varied slightly depending on whether it was defined as a thousandth of an (Admiralty) nautical mile or as a multiple of the imperial yard.

Name
The name (pronounced ) derives from the Old English word fæðm, cognate to the Danish (via the Vikings) word "favn" meaning embracing arms or a pair of outstretched arms. Cognate maybe also via the Old High German word "fadum" of the same meaning. In Middle English it was fathme.

Forms

Ancient fathoms
The Ancient Greek measure known as the orguia (orgyiá, ."outstretched") is usually translated as "fathom". By the Byzantine period, this unit came in two forms: a "simple orguia" (haplē orguiá) roughly equivalent to the old Greek fathom (6 Byzantine feet, m) and an "imperial" (basilikē) or "geometric orguia" (geōmetrikē orguiá) that was one-eighth longer (6 feet and a span, m).

International fathom 
One  fathom is equal to:
 1.8288 metres exactly (Official international definition of the fathom)
 1.828804 m (Obsolete measurement of the fathom based on the US Survey Foot, only for use of historical and legacy applications)
 2 yards (1 yard is exactly  fathom)
 6 feet (1 foot is exactly  fathom)
 18 hands
 72 inches
 1 metre is about 0.5468 fathoms

In the international yard and pound agreement of 1959 the United States, Australia, Canada, New Zealand, South Africa, and the United Kingdom defined the length of the international yard to be exactly 0.9144 metre. In 1959 United States kept the US survey foot as definition for the fathom.

In October 2019, U.S. National Geodetic Survey and National Institute of Standards and Technology announced their joint intent to retire the U.S. survey foot, with effect from the end of 2022. The fathom in U.S. Customary units is thereafter defined based on the International 1959 foot, giving the length of the fathom as exact 1.8288 meters in the United States as well.

British fathom
In practice the "warship fathom" of exactly  was used in Britain and the United States. Until the 19th century in England, the length of the fathom was more variable: from  feet on merchant vessels to either  on fishing vessels (from ).

Derived units
At one time, a quarter meant one-quarter of a fathom.

A cable length, based on the length of a ship's cable, has been variously reckoned as equal to 100 or 120 fathoms.

Use of the fathom

Water depth

Most modern nautical charts indicate depth in metres. However, the U.S. Hydrographic Office uses feet and fathoms. A nautical chart will always explicitly indicate the units of depth used.

To measure the depth of shallow waters, boatmen used a sounding line containing fathom points, some marked and others in between, called deeps, unmarked but estimated by the user. Water near the coast and not too deep to be fathomed by a hand sounding line was referred to as in soundings or on soundings. The area offshore beyond the 100 fathom line, too deep to be fathomed by a hand sounding line, was referred to as out of soundings or off soundings. A deep-sea lead, the heaviest of sounding leads, was used in water exceeding 100 fathoms in depth.

This technique has been superseded by sonic depth finders for measuring mechanically the depth of water beneath a ship, one version of which is the Fathometer (trademark). The record made by such a device is a fathogram. A fathom line or fathom curve, a usually sinuous line on a nautical chart, joins all points having the same depth of water, thereby indicating the contour of the ocean floor.

Some extensive flat areas of the sea bottom with constant depth are known by their fathom number, like the Broad Fourteens or the Long Forties, both in the North Sea.

Line length
The components of a commercial fisherman's setline were measured in fathoms. The rope called a groundline, used to form the main line of a setline, was usually provided in bundles of 300 fathoms. A single  skein of this rope was referred to as a line. Especially in Pacific coast fisheries the setline was composed of units called skates, each consisting of several hundred fathoms of groundline, with gangions and hooks attached.

A forerunner — a piece of cloth tied on a ship's log line some fathoms from the outboard end — marked the limit of drift line.

A shot, one of the forged lengths of chain joined by shackles to form an anchor cable, was usually .

In 1949, the British navy redefined the shackle to be .

The Finnish fathom (syli) is occasionally used:  nautical mile or  cable length.

Burial
A burial at sea (where the body is weighted to force it to the bottom) requires a minimum of six fathoms of water. This is the origin of the phrase "to deep six" as meaning to discard, or dispose of.

The phrase is echoed in Shakespeare's The Tempest, where Ariel tells Ferdinand, "Full fathom five thy father lies".

On land
Until early in the 20th century, it was the unit used to measure the depth of mines (mineral extraction) in the United Kingdom. Miners also use it as a unit of area equal to 6 feet square (3.34 m2) in the plane of a vein. In Britain, it can mean the quantity of wood in a pile of any length measuring  square in cross section. In Central Europe, the klafter was the corresponding unit of comparable length, as was the toise in France. In Hungary the square fathom ("négyszögöl") is still in use as an unofficial measure of land area, primarily for small lots suitable for construction.

See also

 Ancient Greek units of measurement
 Anthropic units
 Bathymetry
 English unit
 Hvat
 Imperial unit
 International System of Units
 United States customary units
 Sounding line
 Toise
 Klafter

References

Citations

Bibliography
.

External links

An explanation of the fathom marks used at sea (retrieved Sept 2005).
Hungarian web page that refers to the length of a "bécsi öl"

Human-based units of measurement
Nautical terminology
Units of length
Customary units of measurement in the United States